Kollam Municipal Corporation (KMC) is an ISO 9001:2015 certified civic body that governs the city of Kollam in the Indian state of Kerala. It is the fourth-largest city corporation by population in the state, and the fifth-largest by area. Constituted in 1903 it was officially recognized as a city corporation in 2000. The body governs an area of  centered at Kollam, with about 55 divisions and a population of 397,419.

History
Kollam, known historically as Quilon, was an ancient trade hub and one of the largest port cities in Asia. The population density of the coastal belt of Kollam is very high compared to any other city in the state. After the constitution of Kochi, it became a corporation in 1967 as there were intense demands to upgrade the densely populated Kollam City into a City Corporation. As a result, on 1October 2000, Kollam Municipality was upgraded to a Municipal Corporation by the Kerala Government.

The city population of Kollam increased substantially from 139,852 in 1991 to 346,013 in 2011. In 1991, the Vadakkevila, Sakthikulangara, Eravipuram and Kilikollur Panchayats were merged with Kollam City.

Structure

The City Corporation of Kollam has a 55-member council headed by a mayor, who is assisted by a deputy mayor. The average population of every ward is around 7,000. Each ward is represented in the Municipal Council by an elected councilor. The Kerala Municipalities (KM) Act, 1994, governs all functions in the KMC. The Corporation has eight standing committees for smooth governance of the city. Each of these committees is headed by an elected councilor, who serves as its chairperson. The standing committees are: Finance,  Development, Welfare, Health and Education, Public works, Town planning, Tax appeal and Education and Sports.

Zones

For ease of administration, the KMC is divided into the following seven zones, each housing a zonal office: Central Zone - 1,  Central Zone - 2,
Sakthikulangara Zone,  Vadakkevila Zone,  Kilikollur Zone, Eravipuram Zone and Thrikkadavoor Zone.

Councils
The KMC consists of 55 divisions or councils spread across its seven zones.

In 2014, Mrs. Prasanna Earnest, then-mayor of Kollam was selected as the Best Lady Mayor of South India by the Rotary Club of Trivandrum Royal.

Functions

As per the Kerala Municipal Act of 1994, the Government of Kerala transferred powers and functions to local self-governments in 1995, along with institutions, offices, and functionaries. Consequently, 18 functions are maintained by the Municipal Corporation:

 Regulation of land use and construction of buildings 
 Roads and bridges 
 Sanitation and Solid Waste Management
 Slum improvement/upgradation 
 Urban poverty alleviation 
 Provision of urban amenities such as parks and playgrounds 
 Promotion of cultural, educational, and aesthetic aspects 
 Burial grounds and crematoria 
 Cattle pounds 
 Public health - Sewerage, water supply
 Registration of births and deaths 
 Public conveniences including street lighting, parking lots, etc. 
 Regulation of slaughterhouses
 Spatial planning (urban and socio-economic planning)
 Urban forestry
 Fire fighting
 Education 
 Safeguarding the interests of weaker sections

Revenue sources 

The following are the Income sources for the Corporation from the Central and State Government.

Revenue from taxes  
Following is the Tax related revenue for the corporation.

 Property tax.
 Profession tax.
 Entertainment tax.
 Grants from Central and State Government like Goods and Services Tax.
 Advertisement tax.

Revenue from non-tax sources 

Following is the Non Tax related revenue for the corporation.

 Water usage charges.
 Fees from Documentation services.
 Rent received from municipal property.
 Funds from municipal bonds.

Kollam City Corporation Election history
The first local body election after Kollam municipality was upgraded to a corporation took place in 2000.

Election Result - 2020

Election Result - 2015

Election history
Since the incorporation of the KMC in 2000, only the LDF has been in power.

Mayors of Kollam

Former Municipal Chairmen of Old Quilon Municipality

Annual budget
A budget will be presented on either January or February month of every year in Kollam Corporation. It usually envisages expenditure, revenue and surplus for that financial year.

Kollam Corporation projects under construction/ completed

Chinnakada Underpass

The Chinnakada underpass is a public road infrastructure project for the city of Kollam, as part of the Kerala Sustainable Urban Development Project. It is supported by the Asian Development Bank (ADB) to ease traffic congestion at Chinnakada, the city CBD of Kollam. The presence of an existing railway over-bridge and three close intersections with heavy traffic limits options for traffic management measures, including junction improvement. This caused the authorities to conceptualize the underpass at Chinnakada. Chinnakada is a complex junction where roads from Thiruvananthapuram, Alappuzha, Downtown, Sengottai, Ashramam(Residency Road), Kollam Beach and the City bus stand road meet.

The underpass was opened to the public at the end of May 2015.

Marine Aquarium at Kollam Beach
On 22June 2014, construction work started on a marine aquarium at Kollam Beach—the first of its kind in the state of Kerala. The Harbour Engineering Department constructed the aquarium on the eastern side of the beach for the KMC. The foundation stone for the project was laid in March 2014 and it was inaugurated on 14 July 2019. The aquarium has 24 tanks worth Rs. 25 lakh, a pool with a 12,000-litre capacity, and 18 varieties of fish. The facility is open to the public in the evenings.

Popular activities/ achievements
 ISO 9001:2015 certification: In May 2019, Kollam City Corporation achieved the ISO 9001: 2015 certification for the best municipal administration and services.

 IUDI Conclave: The city hosted a three-day national conclave, 'Kollam City Vision', 20–22 September 2019. Jointly organised by the KMC and the Institute of Urban Designers India (IUDI), this was the second-ever IUDI conclave and the first one outside New Delhi.

 E-governance facilities: On 4 November 2019, the KMC launched the Intelligent Property Management System (IPMS) to regulate the recording and tax-filing of properties, and Integrated Management System (IMS), an e-governance facility. A touch-screen ‘information kiosk’ has been placed in front of the KMC headquarters in Kollam Cantonment for the public to clear their queries, track applications and search for information. A digital screen, replacing notice boards, has been placed inside the office to provide information to the public.

See also
 Kollam
 Kollam District
 Kollam Lok Sabha constituency
 Kollam Assembly Constituency
 2020 Kollam Municipal Corporation election

References

External links

 Kollam Corporation Opens Marine Aquarium at Kollam Beach

1903 establishments in India
Government of Kollam
Municipal corporations in Kerala